ζ Pictoris, Latinised as Zeta Pictoris, is a solitary star in the southern constellation of Pictor. It is visible to the naked eye with an apparent visual magnitude of +5.43. Based upon an annual parallax shift of 28.00 mas as seen from the Earth, the system is located 116.5 light years from the Sun.

This is an evolving F-type subgiant star with a stellar classification of F6 IV. It is a thin disk star with an estimated 1.4 times the mass of the Sun and about 5.3 times the Sun's radius. At the age of 2.6 billion years, Zeta Pictoris is spinning with a projected rotational velocity of 5.6 km/s.

References

F-type subgiants
Pictor (constellation)
Pictoris, Zeta
Durchmusterung objects
035072
024829
1767